The Independent Spirit Award for Best Male Lead was an award presented annually at the Independent Spirit Awards to honor an actor who has delivered an outstanding lead performance in an independent film. It was first presented in 1985, with M. Emmet Walsh being the first recipient of the award for his role as Investigator Loren Visser in Blood Simple. It was last presented in 2022 with Simon Rex being the final recipient of the award for his role in Red Rocket.

Jeff Bridges and Philip Seymour Hoffman are the only actors who have received this award more than once, with two wins each.

In 2022, it was announced that the four acting categories would be retired and replaced with two gender neutral categories, with both Best Male Lead and Best Female Lead merging into the Best Lead Performance category.

Winners and nominees

1980s

1990s

2000s

2010s

2020s

Multiple nominees

2 nominations
 Javier Bardem
 Nicolas Cage
 Robert Duvall
 Aaron Eckhart
 James Franco
 Paul Giamatti
 Jake Gyllenhaal
 Philip Seymour Hoffman
 William H. Macy
 Matthew McConaughey
 Robert Pattinson
 Jeremy Renner
 Tim Roth
 Mickey Rourke
 Campbell Scott
 David Strathairn

3 nominations
 Jeff Bridges
 Ryan Gosling
 Sean Penn
 James Woods

Multiple winners
2 wins
 Jeff Bridges
 Philip Seymour Hoffman

See also
 Academy Award for Best Actor
 Critics' Choice Movie Award for Best Actor
 BAFTA Award for Best Actor in a Leading Role
 Golden Globe Award for Best Actor – Motion Picture Drama
 Golden Globe Award for Best Actor – Motion Picture Musical or Comedy
 Screen Actors Guild Award for Outstanding Performance by a Male Actor in a Leading Role
 Saturn Award for Best Actor

References

External links
Every BEST MALE LEAD winner ever video on Film Independent's official YouTube channel

Male
 
Film awards for lead actor